Ntombezanele Gladys Bakubaku-Vos (born 6 June 1966) is a South African politician serving as a Member of the Western Cape Provincial Parliament since May 2019. She was a municipal councillor of the Stellenbosch Local Municipality. Bakubaku-Vos is a member of the African National Congress (ANC).

On 5 May 2020, Bakubaku-Vos announced that she had tested positive for COVID-19. In response, the Western Cape Provincial Parliament announced that it would undergo a decontamination and sanitisation process.

References

External links
Ntombezanele Gladys Bakubaku-Vos – People's Assembly
Hon Ntombezanele Bakubaku-Vos – Western Cape Provincial Parliament (WCPP) (Archived)

Living people
1966 births
People from Paarl
People from Stellenbosch
Members of the Western Cape Provincial Parliament
African National Congress politicians
21st-century South African politicians
People from the Western Cape
Politicians from the Western Cape
21st-century South African women politicians
Women members of provincial legislatures of South Africa